Listen to Little Red is the debut studio album by Australian rock band Little Red, released through Shock Records on 28 June 2008. Listen to Little Red entered and peaked on the Australian album charts at number 29. The album's label, Hooch Hound Records, was created by the band and named after a song that failed to make it to the album.

Track listing

Charts

References

2008 albums
Little Red (band) albums